The Akvitlak Islands are an island group located in the Coronation Gulf, south of Victoria Island, in the Kitikmeot Region, Nunavut, Canada. Other island groups in the vicinity include the Aiyohok Islands, Duke of York Archipelago, Home Islands, Miles Islands, Nauyan Islands, Outcast Islands, and Sisters Islands.

References

 Akvitlak Islands at the Atlas of Canada

Islands of Coronation Gulf
Uninhabited islands of Kitikmeot Region